Cenk Akyol (born 16 April 1987) is a Turkish professional basketball coach and former player who played at the shooting guard position. He is assistant coach for Galatasaray Nef of the Turkish Basketbol Süper Ligi (BSL).

Professional career
On 3 July 2015, Akyol signed a multi-year contract with Beşiktaş Integral Forex. After one season he left the club. On 20 October 2016, he signed with Acıbadem Üniversitesi of the Turkish Basketball First League.

NBA
Akyol was drafted 59th overall in the 2005 NBA Draft by the Atlanta Hawks. On 20 February 2014 the Atlanta Hawks traded Akyol's draft rights to the Los Angeles Clippers in exchange for Antawn Jamison and on 7 January 2015 the Clippers traded his rights to the Philadelphia 76ers, along with Jared Cunningham and cash for the rights to Sergei Lishouk. On 19 February 2015 he was again traded to the Denver Nuggets for Javale McGee and the rights to Chukwudiebere Maduabum. On 18 January 2017 Akyol's draft rights were traded back to the Atlanta Hawks in exchange for the player rights of Mo Williams and cash considerations. His draft rights would later be traded once again, on 23 February 2017, alongside Mike Scott and cash considerations for a Top-55 protected second round pick from the Phoenix Suns.

On 2 July 2018 he signed with Sigortam.net İTÜ Basket of the Turkish Basketball First League.

Turkish national team
Akyol is also a regular Turkish national team player.

Coaching career
As of August 2021, he started to work as an assistant coach at Galatasaray Nef.

Personal life
On 21 August 2013 Akyol married national volleyball player and member of Vakıfbank Volleyball Naz Aydemir.

References

External links

 Official website 
 Cenk Akyol at draftexpress.com
 Cenk Akyol at eurobasket.com
 Cenk Akyol at euroleague.net
 Cenk Akyol at tblstat.net
Cenk Akyol at fiba.com

1987 births
Living people
2006 FIBA World Championship players
2010 FIBA World Championship players
2014 FIBA Basketball World Cup players
Anadolu Efes S.K. players
Atlanta Hawks draft picks
Basketball players from Istanbul
Beşiktaş men's basketball players
Galatasaray S.K. (men's basketball) players
İstanbul Teknik Üniversitesi B.K. players
People from Kadıköy
S.S. Felice Scandone players
Shooting guards
Small forwards
Turkish expatriate basketball people in Italy
Turkish men's basketball players